Élisabeth Lutz (May 14, 1914 – July 31, 2008) was a French mathematician. The Nagell–Lutz theorem in Diophantine geometry describes the torsion points of elliptic curves; it is named after Lutz and Trygve Nagell, who both published it in the 1930s.

Lutz was a student of André Weil at the University of Strasbourg, from 1934 to 1938. She earned a thesis for her research for him, on elliptic curves over -adic fields. She completed her doctorate (thèse d’état) on -adic Diophantine approximation at the University of Grenoble in 1951 under the supervision of Claude Chabauty; her dissertation was Sur les approximations diophantiennes linéaires -adiques.

She became a professor of mathematics at the University of Grenoble.

Selected publications

References

1914 births
2008 deaths
Number theorists
20th-century French mathematicians
21st-century French mathematicians
French women mathematicians
20th-century French women scientists
University of Strasbourg alumni
Grenoble Alpes University alumni
Academic staff of Grenoble Alpes University
20th-century women mathematicians
21st-century women mathematicians
21st-century French women